This is a list of Western Sydney Wanderers FC W-League players both past and present.

† indicates player capped internationally

A
 Teigen Allen†
 Mackenzie Arnold†

B
 Jordan Baker
 Alisha Bass
 Hannah Beard
 Sarina Bolden

C
 Trudy Camilleri
 Catherine Cannuli†
 Michelle Carney
 Caitlin Cooper†

D
 Lizzie Durack†

F
 Louise Fors†

G
 Heather Garriock†
 Shawna Gordon

H
 Erica Halloway
 Vanessa Hart
 Thora Helgadottir†
 Tori Huster
 Alexandra Huynh
 Bryleeh Henry†
 Sarah Hunter

J
  Kendall Johnson

K
 Olivia Kennedy
 Alanna Kennedy†
 Jenna Kingsley†

L
 Camille Levin
 Rachel Lowe†

M
  Carmelina Moscato†
 Jada Mathyssen-Whyman

O
 Linda O'Neill

P
 Helen Petinos
 Dimi Poulos

S
 Candace Sciberras
 Jessica Seaman
 Rachael Soutar
 Samantha Spackman

T
 Renee Tomkins

U
 Servet Uzunlar†

V
 Emily van Egmond†

W
 Sarah Walsh†
  Keelin Winters

Players
Lists of soccer players by club in Australia
Sydney-sport-related lists
Association football player non-biographical articles